Knut Erik Johannessen (born 7 September 1955) is a Norwegian alpine skier. He was born in Oslo, and represented the club Njård IL. He competed at the 1980 Winter Olympics in Lake Placid.

He was Norwegian champion in slalom in 1977 and 1979.

References

1955 births
Living people
Alpine skiers from Oslo
Norwegian male alpine skiers
Olympic alpine skiers of Norway
Alpine skiers at the 1980 Winter Olympics